Cattle Hill Wind Farm is a wind farm project developed and constructed by Goldwind Australia, in Tasmania.  

The site is located on the eastern shore of Lake Echo on the southern side of the Central Plateau of Tasmania and connects into TasNetworks's transmission network at the adjacent Waddamana Substation.

The facility began construction in 2018 and was completed in 2020 with the installation of 48 Goldwind GW140 3MW turbines, each standing at 170m tall. 

The wind farm's output of 144MW is equivalent to the consumption of approximately 63,000 homes.

Operations 
The generation table uses "eljmkt nemlog", a tracker for the Australian National Energy Market, to obtain generation values for each month. Grid connection started in January 2020, and was fully commissioned in August 2020.

Note: Asterisk indicates power output was limited during the month.

See also
 Wind power in Australia

References

External links
 Cattle Hill Wind Farm website

Wind farms in Tasmania
Proposed wind farms in Australia